The Little River is a  tributary of the Ouachita (Black) River in central Louisiana in the United States.  Via the Ouachita and Red rivers, it is part of the watershed of the Mississippi River.  According to the Geographic Names Information System, the Little River has also been known historically as "Bayou Des Nacitoches," "Catahoula Bayou," and "Catahoula River."

It flows initially southeastwardly along the boundaries of Grant, LaSalle, and Rapides parishes, before turning east-northeastwardly into LaSalle Parish through Catahoula Lake, which is bordered by the Catahoula National Wildlife Refuge. In the twentieth century the waste from the oil production and exploration damaged the riparian lands in LaSalle Parish. After passing through the lake, the Little River continues east-northeastwardly into Catahoula Parish, where it joins the Ouachita River from the west at Jonesville, just downstream of the mouth of the Tensas River. (Below the mouth of the Tensas, the Ouachita River is sometimes known as the "Black River.") 
The Little River, as measured at the USGS station at Rochelle, LA, has a mean annual discharge of 2,260 cubic feet per second.

The state government of Louisiana has designated the uppermost  of the Little River (above Catahoula Lake) as a "Natural and Scenic River."  This portion of the river flows through a mixed oak-gum bottomland forest interspersed with stands of bald cypress.  Sixty prehistoric Native American archaeological sites have been identified along this stretch of the river.

See also
List of Louisiana rivers

References

External links
Catahoula National Wildlife Refuge

Rivers of Louisiana
Rivers of Catahoula Parish, Louisiana
Rivers of Grant Parish, Louisiana
Rivers of LaSalle Parish, Louisiana
Rivers of Rapides Parish, Louisiana
Tributaries of the Red River of the South
Ouachita River